Mohd Khalid bin Mohd Yunus (born 26 March 1943) is a Malaysian politician. He had served as Deputy Minister in various departments and different cabinets. He also served as Member of Parliament representing Jempol from 1986 to 2004. He was a member of United Malays National Organisation (UMNO), a component party of Barisan Nasional (BN). He currently is a member of Parti Bumiputera Perkasa Malaysia (PUTRA).

Political career
Mohd Khalid Mohd Yunus initially was a Member of Negeri Sembilan State Legislative Assembly representing Jempol. After the Jempol state constituency seat was abolished, he was successfully ran for MP of Jempol in 1986 general elections and Khalid was appointed as Deputy Minister of Land and Regional Development in Mahathir Mohamad third cabinet. Khalid was successfully ran for MP of Jempol in 1990, 1995, 1999 respectively, he had served as Deputy Minister of Land and Cooperative Development from 1990 to 1995, Deputy Minister of Education from 1995 to 1999, Deputy Minister of Information from 1999 to 2002 and Deputy Minister of Entrepreneur Development from 2002 to 2003 following cabinet reshuffle.

In 2018, Khalid joined the Parti Bumiputera Perkasa Malaysia]] (PUTRA) by lefting UMNO. In 2022 general election, he unsuccessfully ran for MP of Jempol.

Mount Everest Expedition
He did not succeed in climbing to the top of Mount Everest, but he reached 7,200 meters. The doctor advised him to stop at that point for health reasons.

Election results

Honours
  :
  Commander of the Order of Loyalty to the Crown of Malaysia (PSM) – Tan Sri (2016)
  :
  Meritorious Service Medal (PJK) (1980)
  Knight Companion of the Order of Loyalty to Negeri Sembilan (DSNS) – Dato' (1987)

External links
 UMNO Online
 Profil Pendaki Negara

References

1943 births
Living people
Former United Malays National Organisation politicians
Members of the Negeri Sembilan State Legislative Assembly